Mal morando is a cutaneous condition caused by onchocerciasis characterized by inflammation that is accompanied by hyperpigmentation.

See also 
 Skin lesion

References 

Parasitic infestations, stings, and bites of the skin